Cuiseaux is a commune in the Saône-et-Loire department in the region of Bourgogne-Franche-Comté in eastern France.

Geography
Cuiseaux is in the far southeastern corner of the department of Saône-et-Loire on the edge of the plain of Bresse at the foot of the first plateau of the Jura mountains.

Gallery

See also
Communes of the Saône-et-Loire department

References

Communes of Saône-et-Loire